The Bonnefanten Museum is a museum of fine art in Maastricht, Netherlands.

History
The museum was founded in 1884 as the historical and archaeological museum of the Dutch province of Limburg. The name Bonnefanten Museum is derived from the French 'bons enfants' ('good children'), the popular name of a former convent that housed the museum from 1951 until 1978.

In 1995, the museum moved to its present location, a former industrial site named 'Céramique'. The new building was designed by Italian architect Aldo Rossi. With its rocket-shaped cupola overlooking the river Maas, it is one of Maastricht's most prominent modern buildings.

Since 1999, the museum has become exclusively an art museum. The historical and archaeological collections were housed elsewhere. The museum is largely funded by the province of Limburg.

In 2009, the museum celebrated its 125th anniversary with the exhibition Exile on Main Street. In 2012, Stijn Huijts became director.

Collection
The combination of old art and contemporary art under one roof gives the Bonnefanten Museum its distinctive character. The department of old masters is located on the first floor and displays highlights of early Italian, Flemish and Dutch painting. Exhibited on the same floor is the museum's extensive collection of Medieval sculpture. The contemporary art collection is usually exhibited on the second floor and focuses on American Minimalism, Italian Arte Povera and Concept Art. The second and third floors are also used for temporary exhibitions.

Old art
The collection old art of the Bonnefanten Museum consists of four main sections: 
 Wooden sculptures dating from the 13th to the 16th century, notably by Jan van Steffeswert (e.g. The Virgin and Child with St. Anne) and the );
 The so-called Neutelings collection of medieval art, consisting of artifacts made of wood, bronze, marble, alabaster and ivory from the Southern Netherlands, France, England and the German Lower Rhine region;
 Italian paintings from the 14th and 15th centuries: Giovanni del Biondo, Domenico di Michelino, Jacopo del Casentino, Sano di Pietro, Pietro Nelli;
 Flemish and Dutch paintings from the 16th and 17th centuries: Colijn de Coter, Jan Mandyn, Jan Provost, Roelandt Savery, Pieter Coecke van Aelst, Pieter Aertsen, Pieter Brueghel the Younger, David Teniers II, Peter Paul Rubens, Jacob Jordaens, Hendrik van Steenwijk II, Gérard de Lairesse, Wallerant Vaillant, Melchior d'Hondecoeter, Jan van Goyen and Cornelis de Bryer.

Contemporary art
Since Alexander van Grevenstein became director in 1986, the Bonnefanten Museum has focused mainly on contemporary art. The main focus of the permanent collection is on:
 Conceptual art: Jan Dibbets, Marcel Broodthaers, Joseph Beuys, Bruce Nauman, Gilbert and George, Ai Weiwei;
 Minimal Art: Sol LeWitt, Robert Ryman, Robert Mangold, Richard Serra;
 Arte Povera: Luciano Fabro, Mario Merz, Jannis Kounellis;
 Neo-expressionism: Neo Rauch, Peter Doig, Gary Hume, Grayson Perry, Luc Tuymans, Marlene Dumas.

The collection also features video art and room-size installations by younger artists: Atelier Van Lieshout, Francis Alÿs, David Claerbout, Patrick Van Caeckenbergh, Roman Signer, Franz West, Pawel Althamer.

In 2011, a deal was negotiated between the collectors Jo and Marlies Eyck and the province of Limburg. The result was that the Eyck collection of postwar art and the castle of Wijlre and its grounds, are now part of the museum.

Gallery

See also
Google Arts & Culture

Bibliography, references and notes
 Szénássy, I.L. (ed.), Bonnefantenmuseum. Het gebouw. Het museum. De verzamelingen. Maastricht, 1984
 Szénássy, I.L. (ed.), Kunst in het Bonnefantenmuseum. Maastricht, 1984
 Szénássy, I.L. (ed.), Oudheden in het Bonnefantenmuseum. Maastricht, 1984
 Poel, P. te, Bonnefantenmuseum. Collectie Middeleeuws Houtsnijwerk. Maastricht, 2007
 Poel, P. te, Bonnefantenmuseum. Collectie Neutelings. Maastricht, 2007
 Quik, T., Bonnefantenmuseum. De geschiedenis. Maastricht, 2007
 Timmers, J.J.M., Catalogus van schilderijen en beeldhouwwerken. Maastricht, 1958
 Wegen, R. van, and T. Quik (ed.), Bonnefantenmuseum Maastricht. Maastricht, 1995

External links
Bonnefantenmuseum within Google Arts & Culture

Modern art museums
Art museums and galleries in the Netherlands
Postmodern architecture
Museums in Maastricht
Art museums established in 1884
1884 establishments in the Netherlands
19th-century architecture in the Netherlands